Edo or EDO may refer to:

Culture
 Edo language, a language spoken in Nigeria
 Edo people, the inhabitants of the province, creators of the Benin Empire
 Edo period, in Japanese history

Places
 Edo, the historical name for Tokyo, Japan
 Edo River, a river in Japan
 Edo State, a state in Nigeria
 Edo (Wolaita), town in Wolayita Zone of Ethiopia
 Edo, the historical name for Benin City, Nigeria

People
 Edo (given name)
 Edo (surname)

Technology
 Edo Aircraft Corporation, a defunct American aircraft float designer
 EDO Corporation, an American technology company
 Extended data out DRAM, a type of computer memory
 Extended Duration Orbiter, a NASA program

Other uses
 9782 Edo, a main-belt asteroid
 Balıkesir Koca Seyit Airport, IATA code EDO
 Economic development organization
 Ejaculatory duct obstruction
 Environmental Defender's Office NSW
 Environmental Defenders Office (Qld) Inc.
 European Drought Observatory, of the European Commission
 HFC EDO, a football club based in Haarlem, Netherlands
 Edo, a fictional race in Star Trek; see "Justice" (Star Trek: The Next Generation)
 Equal division of the octave, a system of equal temperament tuning in music

See also
 
 Eddo (disambiguation)
 Edos, an operating system
 Edo., abbreviation used for "state" in Mexico (estado(s))